The 16th/22nd Saskatchewan Horse was a cavalry regiment of the Non-Permanent Active Militia of the Canadian Militia (now the Canadian Army). The regiment was formed in 1936, when the 16th Canadian Light Horse was Amalgamated with The Saskatchewan Mounted Rifles. After a number of changes, the regiment now forms part of The North Saskatchewan Regiment.

Lineage

16th/22nd Saskatchewan Horse 

 Originated on 3 July 1905, in Regina, Saskatchewan, as the 16th Mounted Rifles.
 Redesignated on 1 October 1908, as the 16th Light Horse.
 Redesignated on 15 March 1920, as the 16th Canadian Light Horse.
 Amalgamated on 15 December 1936, with The Saskatchewan Mounted Rifles, and Redesignated as the 16th/22nd Saskatchewan Horse.
 Redesignated on 7 November 1940, as the 16th/22nd Saskatchewan Horse (Reserve).
 Converted on 1 April 1941, from Cavalry to Infantry, and Redesignated as the 2nd (Reserve) Battalion, 16th/22nd Saskatchewan Horse.
 Amalgamated on 1 May 1941, with The Battleford Light Infantry and Redesignated as the 2nd (Reserve) Battalion, The Battleford Light Infantry (16th/22nd Saskatchewan Horse).
 Redesignated on 15 September 1944, as The Battleford Light Infantry (16th/22nd Saskatchewan Horse) (Reserve).
 Amalgamated on 1 April 1946, with the 2nd (Reserve) Battalion, The Prince Albert Volunteers and redesignated as The Prince Albert and Battleford Volunteers.

The Saskatchewan Mounted Rifles 

 Originated on 2 March 1908, in Lloydminster, Saskatchewan as the Saskatchewan Light Horse.
 Redesignated on 1 April 1908, as the 22nd Saskatchewan Light Horse.
 Redesignated on 15 March 1920, as The Saskatchewan Mounted Rifles.
 Amalgamated on 15 December 1936, with the 16th Canadian Light Horse.

Perpetuations

North-West Rebellion 

 The Moose Mountain Scouts

The Great War 

 The Canadian Light Horse
 1st Regiment, Canadian Mounted Rifles
 9th Regiment, Canadian Mounted Rifles
 10th Regiment, Canadian Mounted Rifles

History

1936-1939 
As a direct result of the 1936 Canadian Militia Reorganization, the 16th/22nd Saskatchewan Horse was formed by the Amalgamation of the 16th Canadian Light Horse and The Saskatchewan Mounted Rifles.

Second World War

Overseas Unit 
On 24 May 1940, the 16th/22nd Saskatchewan Horse mobilized the 16th/22nd Saskatchewan Horse, CASF for active service. On 26 January 1942, it was Redesignated as the 20th Reconnaissance Battalion (16/22 Saskatchewan Horse), CAC, CASF. On 15 May 1942, it was Redesignated as the 20th Army Tank Regiment (16/22 Saskatchewan Horse), CAC, CASF and was Assigned to the 2nd Canadian Army Tank Brigade. On 16 June 1943, the regiment along with the rest of the 2nd Canadian Army Tank Brigade embarked for Great Britain.

After the brigade was Reorganized as the 2nd Canadian Armoured Brigade, on 1 November 1943, the 20th Army Tank Regiment (16/22 Saskatchewan Horse), CAC was disbanded.

Reserve Unit 
On 1 April 1941, the 16th/22nd Saskatchewan Horse (Reserve) was Converted from Cavalry to Infantry and was Redesignated as the 2nd (Reserve) Battalion, 16th/22nd Saskatchewan Horse. On 1 May 1941, the regiment was Amalgamated with the Battleford portion of the Prince Albert and Battleford Volunteers and designated as The Battleford Light Infantry (16th/22nd Saskatchewan Horse).

Post War 
On 1 April 1946, The Battleford Light Infantry (16th/22nd Saskatchewan Horse) was Amalgamated with The Prince Albert Volunteers to Reform The Prince Albert and Battleford Volunteers (now part of The North Saskatchewan Regiment).

Organization

17th/22nd Saskatchewan Horse (15 December 1936) 

 Regimental Headquarters (Lloydminster, SK)
 A Squadron (Yorkton, SK)
 B Squadron (Saltcoats, SK)
 C Squadron (Lashburn, SK)

Alliances 

  - 9th Queen's Royal Lancers (1936-1946)
  - 16th/5th Lancers (1936-1946)

Battle Honours

North-West Rebellion 

 North West Canada 1885

The Great War 

 Ypres. 1915, ‘17
 Festubert 1915
 MOUNT SORREL
 Somme 1916
 Flers-Courcelette
 Ancre Heights
 ARRAS, 1917, '18
 Vimy, 1917
 HILL 70
 Passchendaele
 Amiens
 Scarpe, 1918
 Drocourt-Quéant
 Hindenburg Line
 Canal du Nord
 Cambrai, 1918
 Valenciennes
 France and Flanders 1915-18

References 

Light Horse regiments of Canada
Military units and formations disestablished in 1946
Military units and formations of Saskatchewan